Air Juan Aviation, Inc., operating as Air Juan, (IATA Code: AO) is a registered scheduled and non-scheduled domestic airline operating in the Philippines with bases in Manila, Puerto Princesa and Cebu. It is the first commercial seaplane operator in the Philippines.

Air Juan is also the only airline company that offers flights to and from Manila outside the heavily congested Ninoy Aquino International Airport as all its seaplane flights arrive and depart from the Air Juan Seaplane Terminal located within the Cultural Center of the Philippines Complex in Pasay, Metro Manila.  Aside from its seaplane operations, the company also has in its fleet helicopters, business jets, and propeller planes for commuter air services in Palawan, Caticlan, and Iloilo.

History
 
Air Juan started operating private charter services in 2012, and scheduled flight services from Puerto Princesa to Cuyo Island, Coron, and Caticlan in 2016. Most recently, Air Juan started operating scheduled seaplane services from Manila to Puerto Galera, Subic, Busuanga Bay, and Boracay without passing through domestic airports as the aircraft flies its passengers directly to the hotels or resorts.

Expansion
 
In 2017, Air Juan announced that it is expanding its seaplane operations and will soon offer flights from Manila to Marinduque, Baler, and Balesin Island resort, though it is uncertain whether it will be a regularly scheduled flight or just through charters. Its Palawan operations have expanded to include Iloilo and Caticlan services from Cuyo Island. In June 2017, Air Juan started operating land planes out of Mactan-Cebu International Airport offering services to Tagbilaran City of Bohol, Siquijor, Biliran, Maasin, Sipalay, and Bantayan Island.  In March 2018, Air Juan began commercial flights between Cebu City and Catbalogan City, Samar's capital. 
Cebu
In Cebu, the seaplane base has been set up within Pond F of SRP (South Road Properties).

At the start of 2018, the seaplane service starts operating from Cebu.

Fleet
AirJuan is the first Philippine carrier to operate a multi-aircraft system as well as seaplanes that allows the airline to offer a wide range of services from business to commuter purposes. The airline operates the following aircraft as of 2017:

Fixed wing aircraft:

Cessna Grand Caravan
 EX
 Amphibian

Helicopters:
Bell 429
Bell 407

References

Sources

External links
Official website 
IATA code search

Airlines of the Philippines
Airlines established in 2012
Companies based in Bonifacio Global City
Seaplane operators
Philippine companies established in 2012